Felimare francoisae is a species of sea slug, a dorid nudibranch, a shell-less marine gastropod mollusk in the family Chromodorididae.

Distribution 
This species occurs in the Atlantic Ocean off Cape Verde and Senegal.

Description

References

Chromodorididae
Gastropods described in 1980
Molluscs of the Atlantic Ocean
Gastropods of Cape Verde
Invertebrates of West Africa